Boston City Council elections were held on November 7, 1989. Eleven seats (seven district representatives and four at-large members) were contested in the general election, as the incumbents in districts 3 and 5 were unopposed. Nine seats (the four at-large members, and districts 1, 6, 7, 8, and 9) had also been contested in the preliminary election held on September 26, 1989.

At-large
Councillors Dapper O'Neil, Christopher A. Iannella, Rosaria Salerno, and Michael J. McCormack were re-elected.

District 1
Councillor Robert Travaglini was re-elected.

District 2
Councillor James M. Kelly was re-elected.

District 3
Councillor James E. Byrne ran unopposed and was re-elected.

District 4
Councillor Charles Yancey was re-elected.

District 5
Councillor Thomas Menino ran unopposed and was re-elected.

District 6
Councillor Maura Hennigan was re-elected.

District 7
Councillor Bruce Bolling was re-elected.

District 8
Councillor David Scondras was re-elected.

District 9
Councillor Brian J. McLaughlin was re-elected.

See also
 List of members of Boston City Council

References

Further reading
 
 
 

City Council election
Boston City Council elections
Boston City Council election
Boston City Council